Aforia circinata, common name the ridged turrid, is a species of sea snail, a marine gastropod mollusk in the family Cochlespiridae.

Description
The shell grows to a length of 75 mm. The slender, elongate shell is covered with a brownish epidermis. There are six evenly rounded whorls, but with a sharp carina, above which they are smooth, whilst below it they are grooved, with wider interspaces. The anal sinus is deep, about one-third of the way from the carina to the suture.

(Original description) The shell is slender, elongate and covered with a brownish epidermis. It contains six whorls , with a single, sharp, narrow carina, about the middle of the whorl in the upper whorls. This carina does not interrupt the even rotundity of the whorls so as to produce any flattening of the latter, but appears as if it had been placed upon the equator of the whorl, after the latter had been completed. The posterior surface of the carina and that part of the whorls behind it, are destitute of any but the most microscopic revolving striae, though plainly marked by the deeply notched lines of growth. The anterior surface of carina and whorls is covered with sharp, revolving grooves, with wider interspaces, being about twelve on the body whorl, between the posterior edge of the aperture and the carina. The notch is deep, and about one-third of the way from the carina to the suture. The aperture and the siphonal canal are long and narrow. The outer lip, before the carina, is effuse. The nucleus is white.

Distribution
This marine species occurs in the Bering Sea and in cold waters from Alaska to Japan

References

 Hasegawa K. (2009) Upper bathyal gastropods of the Pacific coast of northern Honshu, Japan, chiefly collected by R/V Wakataka-maru. In: T. Fujita (ed.), Deep-sea fauna and pollutants off Pacific coast of northern Japan. National Museum of Nature and Science Monographs 39: 225–383.
 Hasegawa K. & Okutani T. (2011) A review of bathyal shell-bearing gastropods in Sagami Bay. Memoirs of the National Sciences Museum, Tokyo 47: 97–144. [15 April 2011]

External links
 
 Aurivillius, C.W.S. 1885. Öfversigt öfver de af Vega-Expeditionen insamlade arktiska Hafmollusker. II. Placophora och Gastropoda. In: Nordenskiöld, A.E. (Ed.) Vega-Expedionens Vetenskapliga Iakttagelser, 4: 313–383, pls. 12-13

circinata
Gastropods described in 1873